The Hi-Tech Bangkok City, formerly known as the Thailand Tigers, Chang Thailand Slammers, and the Sports Rev Thailand Slammers is a professional basketball team, based in Bangkok, Thailand, that played in the Asean Basketball League until the 2015–16 ABL season. Currently they play in the Thailand Basketball League (TBL).

Hi-Tech Bangkok City play its home games at the Thai-Japanese Stadium in Bangkok.

Trophies and honours
 2× ABL champion (2011, 2014)
 2× TBL  champion (2013, 2018)
 TBSL  champion (2019) 
 TPBL  champion (2019)
 FIBA Asia Champions Cup
 8th Place (1): 2019

Roster

Miscellaneous
In 2011, former team captain Piyapong Piroon donated his team jacket, a number of his jerseys as well as official balls from the ABL in a charity bid to aid victims of the 2011 Thailand floods. Team owner Nipondh Chawalitmontien offered to double that amount.

Notable players

Local players
 Piyapong Piroon
 Attaporn Lertmalaiporn
 Kannawat Lertlaokul
 Sukdave Gougar
 Montien Wongsawangtum
 Wattana Suttisin
 Bandit Lakhan
 Nakorn Jaisanuk
 Wutipong Dasom
 Chanon Aaron Seangsuwan

Foreign players

  Chris Kuete
  Jason Dixon
  Ardy Larong
  Abby Santos
  Boyet Bautista
  Ricky Ricafuente
  Chester Tolomia
  Devon Sullivan
  Calvin Williams
  Justin Howard
  Michael Earl
   Darrius Brannon
  Patrick Cabahug
  Steven Thomas
  Rex Leynes
  Alex Angeles
  JP Alcaraz
  DeAndre Thomas
  Chris Garnett
  Kenneth Walker
   Ike Nwankwo
  Chaz Twan Briggs
  Froilan Baguion
  Jonathan Fernandez
  Chris Charles
  Luis "Tonino" Gonzaga
  Jeric Canada

Coaches
  Chuck Davisson /  Mawinporn Soonphonthont (2009–10)
  Raha Mortel /  Tongkiat Singhasene (2010–11)
  Manit Niyomyindee /  Felton Sealey (2012)
  Joe Bryant (2013)
  Raha Mortel /  Jing Ruiz (2014–present)

References

External links
 Chang Thailand Slammers official website
 ASEAN Basketball League official website
  Chang Thailand Slammers on Facebook

ASEAN Basketball League teams
Basketball teams established in 2009
2009 establishments in Thailand
Basketball teams in Thailand
Sport in Bangkok
Basketball teams in Bangkok